Hamis "Diego" Kiiza (born 10 December 1990) is a Ugandan professional footballer who plays for Kagera Sugar FC in Tanzania premier league.

Personal honours
 Ugandan Player of the year 2011 with URA FC
 Top scorer, Uganda premier league 2010/11with URA FC.
 Top Scorer, Young African FC-Tanzanian Vodacom Premier League 2011/12.
 CECAFA Club Winner and Top scorer with Young African FC 2012.
 Hamis Kiiza With Simba S.C – Tanzania Season 2015–2016 Played 30 MAtches 24 Goals ( 19 in League , 5 FA Cup ), top scorer in all competitions and second runner up top scorer in the Vodacom Premier League

International career
Diego made his Cranes debut for Bobby Williamson in May 2011 when he was called up for the U23 side to face Tanzania in an All Africa Games Qualifier. He repaid the faith shown in him with 3 goals in 2 games against Tanzania and helped the team to the next round to face Kenya. After his impressive displays for the U23 side, he was promoted to the full National Team that will take on Guinea-Bissau in the crucial 2012 African Cup of Nations qualifier on 4 June 2011.
 CHAN Africa Championships in Sudna 2011
 African Cup Qualifiers since 2011 (Senior Team)
 Senior National Team Member since 2011
 U23 National Team All Africa games 2011 (Mozambique)
 U23 National Team Olympics Qualifiers 2011

References

External links
 http://www.goal.com/en/news/89/africa/2011/05/13/2485062/uganda-coach-bobby-williamson-names-squad-for-guinea-bissau
 Hamis Kiiza at Footballdatabase

1990 births
Living people
Ugandan footballers
Uganda international footballers
Association football forwards
El Hilal SC El Obeid players